The Saddleback Lakes are a chain of small alpine glacial lakes in Custer County, Idaho, United States, located in the Sawtooth Mountains in the Sawtooth National Recreation Area.  The lakes are drained by an unnamed tributary of Redfish Lake Creek, which flows into the Salmon River.  There are no trails that lead to the lakes, although they are most easily accessed from Sawtooth National Forest trail 154.

The Saddleback Lakes are in the Sawtooth Wilderness, and a wilderness permit can be obtained at a registration box at trailheads or wilderness boundaries.  The mountain known as Elephants Perch is to the north of the lakes.

See also

 List of lakes of the Sawtooth Mountains (Idaho)
 Sawtooth National Forest
 Sawtooth National Recreation Area
 Sawtooth Range (Idaho)

References

External links

Lakes of Idaho
Lakes of Custer County, Idaho
Glacial lakes of the United States
Glacial lakes of the Sawtooth Wilderness